Baladiyah al-Ma'dher, officially the Al Ma'dher Sub-Municipality is a baladiyah and one of the 14 sub-municipalities of Riyadh, Saudi Arabia. It consists of 9 neighborhoods and districts, partially including al-Olaya and is responsible for their overall planning, development and maintenance.

Neighborhoods and districts 

 Al-Nakhil
 Al-Nakhil al-Gharbi
 Al-Muhammadiyah
 Al-Rahmaniyah
 Al-Ra'id
 Umm al-Hammam al-Gharbi
 Umm al-Hammam al-Sharqi
 Al-Ma'dher al-Shimali
 Al Olaya (partially)

References 

Ma'dher